Tomás "Tommy" Cocha  (born 26 April 1991) is an Argentine professional golfer who currently plays on PGA Tour Latinoamérica having previously played on the Web.com Tour and the Tour de las Américas. Cocha won the silver (men's individual) and bronze medal (mixed team) at the 2015 Pan American Games in Toronto, Canada.

Amateur career
As a junior, Cocha was part of the winning Argentinian team at the 2009 Toyota Junior Golf World Cup in Japan alongside Jorge Fernández-Valdés. As an amateur, Cocha also won the 2009 South American Match Play Championship and the 2010 South American Medal Play Championship.

Professional career
Cocha turned professional in 2010 and initially played on the Tour de las Américas in South America, he played his first PGA Tour event at the 2011 Mayakoba Golf Classic in Mexico.

In 2012, Cocha joined PGA Tour Latinoamérica and achieved his first win as a professional at the 2012 Mundo Maya Open in the tour's inaugural event. This win along with several other strong finishes lead to a 5th-place finish on the PGA Tour Latinoamérica Order of Merit for 2012, which earned Cocha his playing rights on the Web.com Tour for 2013.

In 2013, Cocha had a poor season on the Web.com Tour, only making two cuts in twelve starts. In 2014, Cocha rejoined PGA Tour Latinoamérica and began to regain some form with a runner-up finish at the Roberto De Vicenzo Invitational Copa NEC, a fourth at the Personal Classic, a fifth at the Colombian Classic and a seventh at the Abierto de Chile. He also finished second at The Great Waterway Classic and seventh at the Wildfire Invitational to end 28th on the PGA Tour Canada money list.

Cocha's second win on PGA Tour Latinoamérica came in the second event of the 2015 season at the Mazatlán Open. His score of 271 set the tournament record for the lowest aggregate score. Cocha made it back-to-back wins on PGA Tour Latinoamérica by winning the Abierto del Centro in the next event, in doing so this was Cocha's third win on the tour, equaling the record held by Julián Etulain.

Amateur wins
 2009 South American Match Play Championship
 2010 South American Medal Play Championship.

Professional wins (4)

PGA Tour Latinoamérica wins (4)

Team appearances
Amateur
 Toyota Junior Golf World Cup (representing Argentina): 2009 (winners)
 Eisenhower Trophy (representing Argentina): 2010

References

External links
 
 

Argentine male golfers
PGA Tour Latinoamérica golfers
Golfers at the 2015 Pan American Games
Medalists at the 2015 Pan American Games
Pan American Games silver medalists for Argentina
Pan American Games bronze medalists for Argentina
Pan American Games medalists in golf
Golfers from Florida
Sportspeople from Salta Province
Sportspeople from Jujuy Province
People from Salta
People from Windermere, Florida
1991 births
Living people
21st-century Argentine people